Malcolm John Colmer (born 15 February 1945) is an Anglican priest.

Colmer was educated at the University of Sussex after which he was a Scientific Officer at RAE Bedford.  He studied for the priesthood at St John's College, Nottingham and was ordained  in  1974. After curacies in Egham and  Chadwell he held incumbencies at Lewes. He was Area Dean of Islington from 1990 to 1995;Archdeacon of Middlesex from 1996 to 2005; and Archdeacon of Hereford from 2005 until his retirement in 2010.

Notes

1945 births
Alumni of the University of Sussex
Alumni of St John's College, Nottingham
Archdeacons of Middlesex
Archdeacons of Hereford
Living people